Khurtaga is a rural locality (a selo) in Zakamensky District, Republic of Buryatia, Russia. The population was 884 as of 2010. There are 4 streets.

Geography 
Khurtaga is located 62 km east of Zakamensk (the district's administrative centre) by road. Khamney is the nearest rural locality.

References 

Rural localities in Zakamensky District